The Crime Doctor is the name of two fictional supervillains that appears in American comic books published by DC Comics. The Crime Doctor is an underworld medical expert who caters exclusively to criminals, originally an enemy of Batman.

Publication history
The first Crime Doctor first appeared in Detective Comics #77 (July 1943), and was created by Bill Finger and Bob Kane.

Fictional character biography

Matthew Thorne
The Crime Doctor is surgeon Matthew Thorne, a renowned doctor. In post-Crisis continuity, he is the brother of the Gotham City gangster Rupert Thorne under the name Bradford Thorne.

Earth-Two
On Earth-Two, Matthew Thorne started out as a rogue physician in Gotham City, setting up an illegal clinic and treating criminals for money. He was stopped and apprehended time and time again by the Batman. Shortly after this, Thorne escaped prison and once again opened his crime clinic, but this time he traveled across the country. Batman and Robin learned of his escape and they chased Thorne all the way to California, where Thorne saved Robin's life after he was shot by one of the doctor's henchmen. In the end, Thorne was betrayed by one of his own men, who shot him in the back, killing the doctor almost instantly.

Post-Crisis
Bradford Thorne was a notorious physician who provided criminal services as the Crime Doctor. Thorne assisted criminals using his medical knowledge in return for a small percentage of the stolen loot. His modus operandi stumped the authorities of Gotham City and caused Batman to turn his attention on his crimes.

Thorne eventually learned Batman's secret identity when Bruce Wayne went to see him, seeking his medical support. When the underworld learned that Thorne knew Batman's secret, Thorne was kidnapped by businessman Sterling T. Silversmith, who poisoned Thorne to make him reveal the truth. Batman stopped Silversmith, but Thorne's body had been damaged by the mercury poisoning and the diagnosis given to him was not positive, as he was most likely to remain in a comatose state for life and in the case of an eventual recovery, his memory would be completely wiped out. 

The Crime Doctor usually never took part in physical battles against superheroes, but he was recruited by Lex Luthor and Brainiac into their supervillain army during the Crisis on Infinite Earths. Initially, the Crime Doctor took his career as a doctor very seriously, and would not commit crimes that conflicted with his Hippocratic Oath. In later appearances however, he seemed to abandon this principle.

The Crime Doctor's appearances in the 21st century have depicted him wearing star-shaped glasses. It was later revealed that those glasses were a trophy taken from his first victim, a young nurse named Katherine Wheyhall, who had suspected his sadistic inclination to murder and torture while witnessing him deliberately botching a surgery.

Later, the Crime Doctor paid a visit to the nurse and killed her, thus setting the basis of his newfound criminal career.

The Crime Doctor appears in Villains United (2006), where he tortures the Secret Six for the identity of Mockingbird. This fails in the case of the 'Mike the Parademon', who equates torture with love. Breaking his restraints, Catman knocks him out with a metal tray table (where the Doctor had his medical equipment).

In the "Progeny" arc of Birds of Prey, the Crime Doctor tries to "defect" from the Secret Society of Super Villains. The Society sends Prometheus to repay the Crime Doctor by torturing and killing his daughter as he had done to his victims. After a gruesome battle, the Birds of Prey almost manage to subdue Prometheus, but the Crime Doctor decides to kill himself, thus ensuring his own punishment, and sparing his daughter Bethany, who, alone and outcast by the other children, subsequently falls prey to the ambition of Lady Shiva to have a young apprentice to mold in her image.

Anica Balcescu
A new, female Crime Doctor appeared in Manhunter (vol. 4) #32 (2008), a Romanian widow and survivor of the Nicolae Ceauşescu regime named Anica Balcescu.

Following the Final Crisis, Anica Balcescu was seen as a member of Cheetah's Secret Society of Super Villains as she grafted Wonder Woman's lasso to Genocide.

Powers and abilities
The original Crime Doctor had no super human powers, but was a skilled physician and an expert torturer. He sometimes carried an injector gun which could gas opponents to sleep. He also sometimes used a scalpel to assault his opponents.

In other media
The Crime Doctor appears in the Batman: The Animated Series episode "Paging The Crime Doctor", voiced by Joseph Campanella. This version is made into a sympathetic character. In this portrayal, Matthew Thorne's brother Rupert pushed him into the role. He attended medical school with Thomas Wayne and Leslie Thompkins, the three becoming close friends, but Matthew later lost his medical license after failing to file a report about his brother's gunshot wound to his superiors. With his license gone, he now worked as "The Crime Doctor" for Rupert and his men in hopes that Rupert would one day use his influence in Gotham City to get Matthew his license back. In the episode, Rupert needed surgery and since he was paranoid that his enemies would attack him during his moment of "weakness", he asked Matthew to perform it. Needing an assistant, Rupert had his men abduct Dr. Leslie Thompkins. Rupert Thorne wanted for Thompkins to be killed after the surgery to prevent her from telling anything to the police, but Matthew ultimately went against his brother's orders and helped Leslie escape from Rupert and both were aided by Batman. Afterwards, Matthew turned himself over to the police. He was later visited by Bruce Wayne who paid his bail. Although Matthew thought Bruce would try to exploit him like Rupert had, Matthew found that Bruce only wanted him to tell him about his father and gladly obliged.

In Batman: Arkham Knight, a lab coat within an office in Elliot Memorial Hospital bears an ID badge with Bradford Thorne's name and face hanging from the breast pocket.

References

External links
 Unofficial Guide to DC Comics entry
 The DC Database's summary of the Crime Doctor's debut

Comics characters introduced in 1943
DC Comics supervillains
DC Comics male supervillains
Fictional physicians
Fictional murderers
Characters created by Bob Kane
Characters created by Bill Finger
Fictional Romanian people